Viktor Lipsnis (6 December 1933 – 25 September 1997) was a Soviet shot putter who won silver medals at the 1958 and 1962 European championships. He competed at the 1960 and 1964 Olympics and finished in fourth and tenth place, respectively. Lipsnis was born in Ukraine, but lived through most of his career in Saint Petersburg. He won three Soviet titles (1960–1962) and set eight Soviet records (1958, 1960, 1962, 1964) in the shot put.

References

1933 births
1997 deaths
Sportspeople from Chernihiv
Soviet male shot putters
Ukrainian male shot putters
Olympic athletes of the Soviet Union
Athletes (track and field) at the 1960 Summer Olympics
Athletes (track and field) at the 1964 Summer Olympics
European Athletics Championships medalists
Universiade medalists in athletics (track and field)
Universiade gold medalists for the Soviet Union
Medalists at the 1961 Summer Universiade